Avengers Arena is a comic book series published by Marvel Comics that debuted in December 2012 as part of the Marvel NOW! relaunch. The series shows 16 young heroes from the Marvel Universe and pit them against each other in a kill-or-be-killed, reality-show-like scenario in Murderworld run by Arcade. The series ended with issue 18 and was followed by a sequel titled Avengers Undercover that dealt with the survivors infiltrating the Shadow Council's Masters of Evil.

Publication history
In September 2012, Marvel Comics announced that Avengers Arena would debut, with a December 2012 cover date, by the creative team of Dennis Hopeless and Kev Walker. The series ran 18 issues, and was followed by a sequel series, Avengers Undercover.

The comic has a battle royale theme, notably inspired by the Japanese novel/manga/film Battle Royale and the American young adult dystopian novel/film series The Hunger Games.

Plot
Sixteen teenage superheroes are abducted by supervillain Arcade, brought to his latest version of Murderworld, and forced to fight to the death for Arcade's enjoyment.

As the games begin, Red Raven tries to escape from the area only for her to be killed when an invisible force field breaks her neck and causes her to crash to the ground. Rebecca Ryker faces off against Hazmat and then fights Cammi soon after. Cammi gives her the nickname Death Locket. Throughout the first day, Death Locket remembers the past events that led to her origins.

As the young heroes sleep for the night, they are stalked by an unidentified cybernetic creature. 

After several days pass, Arcade shuts off the food supply and makes the weather conditions hazardous in Murderworld, but notes there are safe zones at the edge of each quadrant for the competitors to rest, as well as food and medicine in Quadrant 2. Reptil is injured by an explosion. Hazmat and X-23 take him to the quadrant 2 to get medical supplies for Reptil's burns. Nara, Anachronism, and Bloodstone discover that Apex is manipulating Death Locket and Kid Briton to her own ends. The trio is then teleported by Arcade to the supply cache at Quadrant 2 just as Apex, Death Locket, and Kid Briton arrive. The heroes begin fighting among themselves.

Juston Seyfert is revealed to have survived the attack from the cybernetic creature, but is now paralyzed below the waist due to the injuries sustained when the Sentinel crashed. Distraught at the loss of his best friend, Juston salvages the remains of the Sentinel and creates a suit of battle armor which he uses to attack Death Locket. After being injured by Apex, Nico sacrifices herself by staying behind in order to get some of the other survivors to safety. She is killed by Chase and Juston Seyfert's Sentinel (both of whom were under Apex's control).

Reptil turns into a sea dinosaur in order to hunt some sharks for him and Hazmat to dine upon. The remaining teenage heroes catch up to them and are invited to have shark steaks with them before returning to Murderworld. Molly Hayes notices that Nico and Chase are missing and turns to Henry Pym for help.

Cullen Bloodstone attacks Anachronism, forcing Cammi to try to calm him down. Hazmat and X-23 encounter a Mettle robot with Trigger Scent, causing X-23 to go on the attack. X-23 seriously injures Hazmat leaving her fate unknown. Cammi attempts to stop X-23, but her attempts are useless. Cullen decides only he can stop her. Upon removing his family's ring, Cullen transforms into a monstrous form in order to save them. 

As Cullen Bloodstone's monster form continues to fight X-23, Cammi, Nara and Anachronism look for Cullen's ring. Nara ends up diving into the ocean to find it. Nara emerges from the ocean with the ring which attracts Cullen, who ends up killing her.

Apex uses her ability to take over Deathlocket's systems and plans to become Queen of Murderworld. As Hazmat is close to exploding, Reptil swims her out to sea so that the explosion can't harm anyone. The explosion causes everyone to stop fighting each other. Deathlocket shoots Apex off-screen and shuts down Murderworld. Afterwards, the surviving teenagers are rescued by S.H.I.E.L.D., Wolverine, Henry Pym, and Captain Britain. Reptil is fished out of the water by a S.H.I.E.L.D. Agent.

Characters

*characters were featured as part-time students in Avengers Academy later in that series

Death Locket and the students from the Braddock Academy were created by Hopeless and Walker just for Avengers Arena

Collected editions

In other media
In September 2021, Variety reported that the character of Katy (portrayed by Awkwafina) in the Marvel Cinematic Universe (MCU) film Shang-Chi and the Legend of the Ten Rings was considered a loose adaptation of Katy / Apex, a character created for Avengers Arena.

References

Avengers (comics) titles
Fiction about death games